Josette Amouretti (5 March 1914 − 5 September 1990) is a former French tennis player. Josette emerged as runners-up in the South of France Championships in 1950, which is also her career achievement in tennis. She also represented France in her only Wimbledon appearance during the 1950 Wimbledon Championships, where she couldn't qualify beyond the 3rd round. 

She was also the quarter finalist in the women's singles at the 1954 French Championships.

References 

French female tennis players
Professional tennis players before the Open Era
1914 births
1990 deaths